The Union with Scotland (Amendment) Act 1707 (6 Ann c 40) is an Act of the Parliament of Great Britain. It is chapter VI in the common printed editions.

This Act was partly in force in Great Britain at the end of 2010.

It united the English and Scottish Privy Councils and decentralised Scottish administration by appointing justices of the peace in each shire to carry out administration. In effect it took the day-to-day government of Scotland out of the hands of politicians and into those of the College of Justice.

Section 4
This section was repealed by the Schedule to the Circuit Courts and Criminal Procedure (Scotland) Act 1925.

Section 5
This section was repealed by section 175 of, and Schedule 9 to, the Representation of the People Act 1949.

Section 6
This section was repealed by the Statute Law Revision Act 1867.

See also
Acts of Union 1707

References
Halsbury's Statutes,

External links
The Union with Scotland (Amendment) Act 1707, as amended, from Legislation.gov.uk.

Great Britain Acts of Parliament 1707
Privy Council of England
Privy Council of Scotland
College of Justice
Acts of the Parliament of Great Britain concerning Scotland
Government of Scotland
Constitutional laws of Scotland
Home rule in the United Kingdom
Counties of Scotland
History of local government in Scotland
1707 in politics
1707 in Scotland
Political history of Scotland
Constitutional laws of the United Kingdom